Radosław Sylwestrzak (born 8 September 1992) is a Polish footballer who plays as a defender for KSZO Ostrowiec Świętokrzyski.

Career

Sylwestrzak started his career with Polish fourth division side Ilanka Rzepin.

Before the second half of 2013–14, Sylwestrzak signed for GKS Katowice in the Polish second division, where he made 7 appearances and scored 0 goals.

Before the second half of 2014–15, he signed for Polish fourth division club Formacja Port 2000 Mostki.

In 2015, he signed for Radomiak Radom in the Polish third division.

In 2017, Sylwestrzak signed for Polish fourth division team Widzew Łódź.

In 2019, he signed for Stal Rzeszów in the Polish third division.

References

External links
 
 

Polish footballers
I liga players
II liga players
III liga players
1992 births
Association football defenders
Stal Rzeszów players
Widzew Łódź players
Siarka Tarnobrzeg players
Radomiak Radom players
GKS Katowice players
KSZO Ostrowiec Świętokrzyski players
People from Słubice
Living people